Nasim Akhtar Chaudhry is a Pakistani politician who was a member of the National Assembly of Pakistan from 2002 to 2013.

Political career
She was elected to the National Assembly of Pakistan as a candidate of Pakistan Peoples Party on a seat reserved for women from Punjab in the 2002 Pakistani general election.

She was re-elected to the National Assembly of Pakistan as a candidate of Pakistan Peoples Party on a seat reserved for women from Punjab in the 2008 Pakistani general election. She served as chairperson of National Assembly's standing committee on law and justice during her second tenure as Member of the National Assembly.

Personal life
Chaudhry's son is Hamza Ali Abbasi, who is a television anchor, director and actor.

References

Pakistani MNAs 2002–2007
Pakistani MNAs 2008–2013
Pakistan People's Party MNAs